Duan Yingying (born 3 July 1989) is a Chinese former professional tennis player.

In her career, she won one singles title and three doubles titles on the WTA Tour, and two WTA Challenger doubles titles, as well as eleven singles and three doubles titles on the ITF Women's Circuit.
Her nickname is lightning for her amazing forehand.

On 24 April 2017, she reached her career-high singles ranking of world No. 60. On 3 February 2020, she peaked at No. 16 in the doubles rankings.

Career

2012
Starting the year as the No. 378 in the world, Duan's ranking would improve significantly to No. 128 by the year's end. Some of the highlights of her 2012 season included winning four ITF titles at the 25k level in Wellington, Changwon, Gimcheon and Goyang. Playing qualifying at the US Open, Duan had her first experience in a Grand Slam tournament. She would win her first qualifying round defeating Réka Luca Jani, but would fall in the next round to Kirsten Flipkens. She received a wild card to the Guangzhou International and won her first WTA Tour main-draw match defeating Luksika Khumkum in the first round. Duan also achieved her best results in ITF events near the end of 2012, reaching the semifinals of $100K+H Ningbo and the finals of $100K Suzhou, losing both matches to top-100 veteran Hsieh Su-wei.

2013
Duan was due to make her main-draw Grand Slam singles debut at Wimbledon, but withdrew to compete in the National Games of China. She made her Grand Slam singles debut in the main draw of the US Open, after winning three qualifying matches. She lost to sixth seed Caroline Wozniacki in the opening round. During the televised commentary of her match against Wozniacki, the commentators compared Duan's game to that of former world No. 1, Lindsay Davenport. They also began referring to her by the nickname of Duan-venport (段文波特) on the Chinese internet.

2015
At Wimbledon, as a qualifier, Duan defeated 2014 finalist Eugenie Bouchard in straight sets in the first round. This was considered one of the biggest upsets of the tournament. In the second round, Duan lost to Tatjana Maria in a long three-set match.

2016: First WTA title
In July, she won her first WTA Tour title at the Jiangxi International Open, defeating Vania King in the final.

2017: Elite Trophy doubles title
In the first-round match at the Shenzhen Open, Duan wasted three match points and eventually lost to first seed and world No. 3, Agnieszka Radwańska. At the Australian Open, she had her best Grand Slam performance to date by defeating Rebecca Šramková and Varvara Lepchenko to reach the third round, where she lost to former world No. 1 and eventual finalist, Venus Williams, by 1–6, 0–6.

Duan won her first ever WTA doubles title at the 2017 Elite Trophy with Han Xinyun.

2018: Second doubles title
Duan won her second doubles title at the Taiwan Open, playing with Wang Yafan.

2019: French Open finalist, Wuhan doubles title
Duan and Zheng Saisai reached the final of the French Open, losing to Tímea Babos and Kristina Mladenovic. 

In September, they reached the quarterfinals of the US Open, however, they were beaten by the eventual champions Elise Mertens and Aryna Sabalenka. The following week, with Zheng unavailable, she partnered with Veronika Kudermetova for the first time to win the doubles title at the Wuhan Open, beating Mertens and Sabalenka in the final.

Grand Slam performance timelines

Singles

Doubles

Significant finals

Grand Slam finals

Doubles: 1 (1 runner-up)

Premier Mandatory and Premier 5 finals

Doubles: 1 (1 title)

WTA Elite Trophy

Doubles: 2 (1 title, 1 runner–up)

WTA career finals

Singles: 1 (title)

Doubles: 8 (3 titles, 5 runner-ups)

WTA Challenger finals

Singles: 1 (1 runner-up)

Doubles: 3 (2 titles, 1 runner-up)

ITF Circuit finals

Singles: 19 (11 titles, 8 runner–ups)

Doubles: 6 (3 titles, 3 runner–ups)

References

External links
 
 

1989 births
Living people
Chinese female tennis players
Tennis players at the 2014 Asian Games
Tennis players at the 2018 Asian Games
Asian Games medalists in tennis
Asian Games silver medalists for China
Medalists at the 2014 Asian Games
Tennis players from Tianjin
Olympic tennis players of China
Tennis players at the 2020 Summer Olympics
21st-century Chinese women